Ernest Arthur Greswell (8 June 1885 in Cuddalore, Madras, India – 15 January 1962 in Minehead, Somerset, England), played first-class cricket for Somerset in 12 matches between 1903 and 1910.

A right-handed opening or middle order batsman and a right-arm slow bowler, Ernest Greswell was educated at Repton School and made his debut for Somerset in a single match in 1903, aged 18, when he opened the innings with Lionel Palairet.

In 1908, his younger brother Bill Greswell started playing for Somerset, becoming a regular member of the side in 1909, and in that season Ernest reappeared in six matches, with a further five in 1910. His highest score was only 44, made in the 1909 match against Middlesex in which brother Bill scored his only first-class century. While Bill went on to a successful, if intermittent, cricket career, Ernest did not play first-class cricket after 1910.

References

1885 births
1962 deaths
English cricketers
Somerset cricketers
British people in colonial India